John Brampton Gurdon, known as Brampton Gurdon, (25 September 1797 – 28 April 1881) was a British Liberal Party and Whig politician.

Family
Born in 1797, Gurdon was the son of Theophilus Thornhagh Gurdon and Anne Mellish. He married Henrietta Susannah Ridley-Colborne — daughter of Nicholas Ridley-Colborne and Charlotte Steele — in 1828, and they had four children:
 Charlotte Gurdon (died 1868)
 Amy Louisa Gurdon (died 1864)
 Robert Thornhagh Gurdon (1829–1902)
 William Brampton Gurdon (1840–1910)

Career
Gurdon was elected a Whig MP for West Norfolk at the 1857 general election and was re-elected as a Liberal in the next general election in 1859. Later, at the 1865 general election, he was defeated.

Gurdon was also a Deputy Lieutenant of Norfolk, Justice of the Peace for Norfolk, and, in 1855, High Sheriff of Norfolk.

References

External links
 

Liberal Party (UK) MPs for English constituencies
UK MPs 1857–1859
UK MPs 1859–1865
1797 births
1881 deaths
Deputy Lieutenants of Norfolk
High Sheriffs of Norfolk